Marta Robles (born 30 June 1963) is a Spanish journalist and writer.

Radio
Marta Robles holds a degree in Information Sciences, Journalism branch, from the Complutense University of Madrid. Before graduating she began working at the magazine Tiempo in 1987.

From there she went to Cadena SER, where she directed and presented an early-morning show entitled De la noche a la mañana.

In 1998 she joined Onda Cero, where she directed and presented the afternoon program A toda radio until 2000. In 2001 she collaborated on 's program .

From September 2008 to June 2010 Robles worked on the  program Queremos hablar, presented by Ana García Lozano.

Since March 2013, she has directed and presented Entre Comillas, a magazine dedicated to the creation of Spanish literature, cinema, and music for EFE.

Television
There she worked alongside  and Daniel Écija, among others.

In October 1989, she returned to Madrid and began to work as coordinator, scriptwriter, and presenter of TVE's regional magazine for Castilla–La Mancha, that was then broadcast from the center in Paseo de la Habana.

When the center moved to Toledo, Marta Robles decided to try her luck on Telemadrid, a newly created regional station, on which she presented the program El Ruedo. She later directed and presented Verano en La Complutense, and then the cultural magazine A todo Madrid. Finally she presented the weekend edition of Telenoticias with Rafa Luque. She remained with that station until 1991.

In 1992 she became an editor on Telecinco's news programs, where she would also present on some occasions.

In 1993, Jesús Hermida signed her to his new Antena 3 program . A year later, she was called on to present  (1994–1997), which collected news of social interest and events.

In April 1996, she presented the historical memory program Qué memoria la mía, directed by José María Íñigo, which only remained on the air for two weeks.

From October 1996 to January 1997, she presented and co-hosted the 9:00 pm edition of the news program Antena 3 Noticias (1996), replacing Pedro Piqueras.

In 1998, still on Antena 3, she presented the investigative program Contraportada, and then the network's international news. A year later, she led the magazine El tiempo pasa, corazón.

In 2004 she returned to Telemadrid to present the magazine Gran Vía de Madrid (2004–2005) and then Madrid a la última (2005–2011), a show about fashion, trends, and current events, which she also created and directed. In 2012 she presented and directed the daily magazine Ahora, Marta, also on Telemadrid.

From 2014 to 2017, she worked on the TVE program . In 2018, she covered the wedding of Prince Harry and Meghan Markle for DKiss.

Print media
She currently writes for the publications La Razón, and Objetivo Bienestar.

From 2014 to 2015 she created, directed, and edited the online magazine Mass Bienestar.

Books
 El mundo en mis manos (1991), with Pedro J. Ramírez, nonfiction
 La dama del PSOE (1992), with Almudena Bermejo, biography of Carmen Romero
 Los elegidos de la fortuna (1999), nonfiction
 Las once caras de María Lisboa (2001), fiction
 Parque Oceanográfico Universal de Valencia (2003), nonfiction
 Diario de una cuarentona embarazada (2008), fiction
 Don Juan (2008), collective fiction
 Madrid me Marta (2010), nonfiction
 Luisa y los espejos (2013), fiction
 Usted primero (2015), with Carmen Posadas, nonfiction
 Obscena. Antología de relatos pornocriminales (2016), collective fiction
 Haz lo que temas. (2016), nonfiction
 A menos de cinco centímetros (2017), fiction

Awards
 1995 Antena de Plata for radio for Si amanece nos vamos
 1995 TP de Oro for Best Presenter for A toda página
 1995 Woman de Oro
 2000 Antena de Oro for A toda radio
 2004 Condado de Noreña National Journalism Award
 2005 Special Communication Award from the Madrid Association of Communication and Public Relations
 2006 Antena de Plata for television for A la última
 2006 Cosmopolitan TV Award
 2011 Antena de Oro Premio extraordinario
 2013 Fernando Lara Novel Award for Luisa y los espejos

Private life
Marta Robles was married to actor , father of her son Ramón, from 1996 to 1997. She is currently married to Luis Martín de Bustamante, father of her sons Miguel and Luis.

References

External links

 
 

1963 births
20th-century Spanish women writers
21st-century Spanish women writers
Complutense University of Madrid alumni
Living people
Spanish radio presenters
Spanish television directors
Spanish television journalists
Spanish television presenters
Spanish women journalists
Spanish women radio presenters
Women television directors
Writers from Madrid
Women television journalists
Spanish women television presenters